Štěpán Zeman (born 9 May 1997) is a Czech handball player for VfL Gummersbach and the Czech national team.

He participated at the 2018 European Men's Handball Championship and will also participate at the 2020 European Men's Handball Championship.

Zeman was formerly a handball player for HC Zubří.

References

1997 births
Living people
Czech male handball players
Expatriate handball players
Czech expatriate sportspeople in Germany